In enzymology, a D-glutamate oxidase is an enzyme that catalyzes the chemical reaction

D-glutamate + H2O + O2  2-oxoglutarate + NH3 + H2O2

The 3 substrates of this enzyme are D-glutamate, H2O, and O2, whereas its 3 products are 2-oxoglutarate, NH3, and H2O2.

This enzyme belongs to the family of oxidoreductases, specifically those acting on the CH-NH2 group of donors with oxygen as acceptor.  The systematic name of this enzyme class is D-glutamate:oxygen oxidoreductase (deaminating). Other names in common use include D-glutamic oxidase, and D-glutamic acid oxidase.  This enzyme participates in d-glutamine and d-glutamate metabolism.

References

 
 

EC 1.4.3
Enzymes of unknown structure